is a genus of extinct millipede arthropods that lived in what is now North America and Europe around 345 to 290 million years ago, from the Viséan stage of the lower Carboniferous Period to the Sakmarian stage of the lower Permian Period. The species of the genus are the largest known land invertebrates of all time, and would have had few, if any, predators.

Morphology
Arthropleura was able to grow larger than modern arthropods, partly because of the greater partial pressure of oxygen in Earth's atmosphere at that time and partly because of the lack of large terrestrial vertebrate predators.

Arthropleura is characterized by a series of well-developed tergites (dorsal exoskeleton) having three lobes like a trilobite, with dorsal surfaces covered by many tubercles. The head is almost unknown, as the anterior oval plate in front of the first trilobate tergite, which previous thought to be head shield, were considered to be a collum (first tergite of millipede trunk) by subsequent studies. Based on the discovery from other arthropleurids (Microdecemplex), the head may have had non-filamentous antennae and trumpet-like organs. It is estimated that Arthropleura had a trilobate tergite number ranging from 28 to 32. The alignment between leg and tergite is not well understood, but at least it is believed to have been diplopodous in some degree: two pairs of legs per tergite, like modern millipede. Alongside the median sternite, there were three pairs of ventral plates located around each leg pair, namely K-, B- and rosette plates, and either the B- or K-plates were thought to be respiratory organs. The body terminated with a trapezoidal telson.

Paleobiology

All found fossils of Arthropleura are believed to be exuviae (molting shells) instead of carcasses. The good preservation of its thin exuviae, buttressing plates around the leg base, and evidence of 3 cm deep trackway fossils (namely the ichnotaxon Diplichnites cuithensis) altogether suggests that they had a sturdy exoskeleton and roamed the land. Arthropleura was once thought to have lived mainly in coal forests. However, it probably lived a forest-independent life, as fossils of the trackway were found in more open areas and fossils were found even after the Carboniferous rainforest collapse.

There is no solid evidence for the diet of Arthropleura, as the fossils that were once considered coprolites, including lycopod fragments and pteridophyte spores, are later considered to be merely coexistence of plant fossils and exuvia remains. Nonetheless, the interpretation of a herbivorous diet is still accepted, and it is estimated that Arthropleura may have eaten not only spores but also sporophylls and seeds, based on its enormous size that possibly required lots of nutrition.

Extinction
Previously, the extinction of Arthropleura was attributed to the decrease of coal forest. However, many fossils have been discovered even after the Carboniferous rainforest collapse, and it is estimated that Arthropleura itself lived a forest-independent life. A more recent proposal is that the diversification of tetrapods and the desiccation of the equator caused it to become extinct.

See also

Diplichnites

References

External links

 

Mississippian first appearances
Carboniferous arthropods of Europe
Carboniferous arthropods of North America
Pennsylvanian extinctions
Fossil taxa described in 1854
Carboniferous myriapods
Carboniferous Scotland
Fossils of Great Britain
Fossils of Scotland
Fossils of Canada